Jordann Pikeur (born 1 September 1990) is a Curaçaoan-Dutch kickboxer. He is the current K-1 Krush Super Welterweight champion.

He was ranked in the Combat Press featherweight top ten between April 2019 and March 2022, peaking at #2.

Kickboxing career
Pikeur participated in the 2015 K-1 Super Welterweight Grand Prix. In the quarterfinals, he defeated Daiki Watabe by a second round KO. In the semifinals, he defeated Sanny Dahlbeck, likewise by a second round KO. In the finals, Pikeur faced Marat Grigorian, and lost the fight in the first round, by knockout.

During Krush 65, Pikeur was scheduled to fight Hiroki Nakajima for the Krush Super Welterweight title. He won the fight by unanimous decision. He successfully defended his title three months later, during Krush 67, defeating Yoichi Yamazaki by knockout. He defended his title for the second time with a unanimous decision win against Yu Hirono.

Pikeur took part in the 2017 K-1 Middleweight Grand Prix. He beat Hinata by unanimous decision in the quarterfinals. He lost by KO, to the eventual tournament winner, Chingiz Allazov in the semifinals.

In his next fight, Jordann was scheduled to defend his Krush title against Yutaro Yamauchi. He beat Yamauchi by a second round KO. He defended his Krush title for the fourth time during Krush 93, when he was scheduled to fight Hiromi Wajima. Pikeur won the fight by unanimous decision.

In November 2018, Pikeur was scheduled to fight the future K-1 Super Welterweight champion Minoru Kimura. He beat Kimura by a third round TKO. During K'Festa 2, Pikeur beat Masaaki Noiri by majority decision.

Jordann was scheduled to defend his Krush title for the fifth time against Katsuya Jinbo during Krush 102. He won the fight by unanimous decision. He extended his winning streak with a knockout of Kaisei Kondo in November 2019.

Pikeur challenged Yuta Kubo for the K-1 Welterweight title during K'Festa 3. Kubo won the fight by unanimous decision.

Championships and awards

 2016 Krush Super Welterweight -70kg Champion 
 2015 K-1 World GP 2015 -70kg Tournament Runner-up

Kickboxing record

|- style="background:#cfc;"
| 2023-03-12 || Win ||align=left| Abiral Ghimire || K-1 World GP 2023: K'Festa 6 || Tokyo, Japan || KO (Left hook) || 3 || 0:06
|- style="background:#fbb;"
| 2022-05-14 || Loss ||align=left| Mustapha Hourri || Fight Time || Noordwijk, Netherlands ||TKO (Doctor stoppage/leg injury) || 2 || 
|- style="background:#fbb;"
| 2022-02-12 || Loss ||align=left| Vasiliy Semenov || Fair Fight XVI || Yekaterinburg, Russia || Decision (Unanimous) || 3 || 3:00 
|-  style="background:#fbb;"
| 2020-03-22|| Loss ||align=left| Yuta Kubo || K-1: K’Festa 3 || Saitama, Japan || Decision (Unanimous) ||3 ||3:00 
|-
! style=background:white colspan=9 |
|-  style="background:#CCFFCC;"
| 2019-11-24 ||Win || align=left| Kaisei Kondo|| K-1 World GP 2019 Yokohamatsuri  || Yokohama, Japan || TKO (3 Knockdowns/Punches)|| 2 || 2:40
|- style="background:#CCFFCC;"
| 2019-06-21|| Win ||align=left| Katsuya Jinbo || K-1 KRUSH FIGHT.102 || Tokyo, Japan || Decision (Unanimous) || 3 || 3:00
|-
! style=background:white colspan=9 |
|- style="background:#CCFFCC;"
| 2019-03-10|| Win ||align=left| Masaaki Noiri || K-1 World GP 2019: K’FESTA 2 || Saitama, Japan || Decision (Majority)|| 3 || 3:00
|-
|-  style="background:#CCFFCC;"
| 2018-11-03 || Win || align=left| Minoru Kimura || K-1 World GP 2018: 3rd Super Lightweight Championship Tournament || Saitama, Japan || TKO (4 knockdowns) || 3 || 1:30
|- style="background:#CCFFCC;"
| 2018-09-30|| Win ||align=left| Hiromi Wajima || Krush.93 || Tokyo, Japan || Decision (Unanimous) || 3 || 3:00
|-
! style=background:white colspan=9 |
|-
|- style="background:#CCFFCC;"
| 2018-01-27|| Win ||align=left| Yutaro Yamauchi || Krush.84 || Tokyo, Japan || KO (Punches) || 2 || 2:20
|-
! style=background:white colspan=9 |
|- 
|-  style="background:#FFBBBB;"
| 2017-06-18 || Loss || align=left| Chingiz Allazov || K-1 World GP 2017 Super Middleweight Championship Tournament, Semi Finals  || Tokyo, Japan || KO (Right Hook) || 1 || 2:17
|- 
|-  style="background:#CCFFCC;"
| 2017-06-18 || Win || align=left| Hinata || K-1 World GP 2017 Super Middleweight Championship Tournament, Quarter Finals  || Tokyo, Japan || Decision (Unanimous) || 3 || 3:00
|-  style="background:#CCFFCC;"
| 2017-03-19 || Win || align=left| William Diender || Fight Time  || Haarlem, Netherlands || Decision || 3 || 3:00
|-
|- style="background:#CCFFCC;"
| 2017-01-15|| Win ||align=left| Yu Hirono || Krush.72 || Tokyo, Japan || Decision (Unanimous) || 3 || 3:00
|-
! style=background:white colspan=9 |
|-
|-
|- style="background:#CCFFCC;"
| 2016-10-16|| Win ||align=left| Brahim Kallah || ACB KB 8: Only The Braves || Netherlands || TKO || 1 ||
|-
|- style="background:#CCFFCC;"
| 2016-07-18|| Win ||align=left| Yoichi Yamazaki || Krush.67 || Tokyo, Japan || KO (Straight Right)|| 2 || 2:42
|-
! style=background:white colspan=9 |
|-
|-
|- style="background:#CCFFCC;"
| 2016-04-10|| Win ||align=left| Hiroki Nakajima || Krush.65 || Tokyo, Japan || Decision (Unanimous)|| 3 || 3:00
|-
! style=background:white colspan=9 |
|-
|-
|- style="background:#CCFFCC;"
| 2016-02-27|| Win ||align=left| Cristian Dorel || King of Kings: World Grand Prix 2016 || Rīga, Latvia || Decision || 3 || 3:00
|-
|-
|- style="background:#CCFFCC;"
| 2016-01-23|| Win ||align=left| Redouan Daoudi || Sportmani Events VIII || Amsterdam, Netherlands || KO || 1 ||
|-
|- style="background:#CCFFCC;"
| 2015-11-28|| Win ||align=left| Angaar Nasr || Ring Stars || Netherlands || Decision || 5 ||3:00
|-  bgcolor="#FFBBBB"
| 2015-10-10 || Loss ||align=left| Jordan Watson || Yokkao 15 || Bolton, England || Decision (unanimous) || 5 || 3:00
|-  style="background:#FFBBBB;"
| 2015-07-04|| Loss ||align=left| Marat Grigorian || K-1 World GP 2015 -70kg Championship Tournament, Final || Tokyo, Japan || KO (punches) || 1 || 1:24
|-
! style=background:white colspan=9 |
|-  bgcolor="#CCFFCC"
| 2015-07-04 || Win ||align=left| Sanny Dahlbeck || K-1 World GP 2015 -70kg Championship Tournament, Semi Finals || Tokyo, Japan || TKO (2 Knockdowns) || 2 || 1:03
|-  style="background:#cfc;"
| 2015-07-04|| Win ||align=left| Daiki Watabe || K-1 World GP 2015 -70kg Championship Tournament, Quarter Finals || Tokyo, Japan || KO (Body Punches) || 2 || 2:55
|-  bgcolor="CCFFCC"
| 2015-05-04 || Win || align=left| Yoshihiro Sato || Krush 54 || Tokyo, Japan || KO (Left Hook)|| 2 || 2:46
|-  bgcolor="FFBBBB"
| 2015-04-17 || Loss || align=left| Buray Bozaryilmaz || World Fighting League || Hoofddorp, Netherlands || Decision (Unanimous) || 3 || 3:00
|-  bgcolor="FFBBBB"
| 2014-11-17 || Loss || align=left| Tadas Jonkus || King of Kings: Hero's Bushido Vilnius 2014 || Vilnius, Lithuania || Decision (Split) || 3 || 3:00
|-  bgcolor="CCFFCC"
| 2014-05-17 || Win || align=left| Tarek Gromnica || Eggesiner Fight Cup || Eggesin, Germany || Decision || 3 || 3:00
|-  bgcolor="FFBBBB"
| 2013-12-21 || Loss|| align=left|  Meletis Kakoubavas || The Battle VIII || Greece || Decision (Unanimous) || 3 || 3:00
|-
| colspan=9 | Legend:

See also
List of male kickboxers

References

External links
 K-1 Profile

Living people
1990 births
Dutch male kickboxers
People from Willemstad
Curaçao sportspeople
Curaçao male kickboxers